The SWM Tiger (大虎) is a 7-seater mid-size crossover SUV that is manufactured by the Chinese manufacturer SWM (automobiles) of Brilliance Shineray.  The SWM Tiger was launched in August 2022 in China as a more rugged model compared to the SWM X3 riding on the same platform.

Overview

The SWM Tiger is a 7-seater vehicle with a 7-seat layout of 2+2+3. The power of the SWM Tiger comes from 3 engine options including the 1.5 liter DG15 engine with a maximum power of 85kW (116 horsepower), and the fuel consumption of the engine declared by the Ministry of Industry and Information Technology is 6.90L/100km. Prices of the SWM Tiger range from 59,900 yuan to 78,900 yuan.

SWM Tiger EDi
The SWM Tiger EDi is the extended-range electric vehicle version of the regular SWM Tiger. The powertrain of the SWM Tiger EDi was jointly developed by SWM and FinDreams, a company under BYD. The Tiger EDi is equipped with a 1.5-liter four-cylinder petrol engine that only powers the battery. The actual power that drives the front wheel comes from an electric motor with 105 kW (143 hp) and 210 Nm. The battery of the SWM Tiger EDi is LFP supporting an all-electric range of 51 km. The combined range of the Tiger EDi with the range-extender exceeds  1,000 km.

References

External links

Tiger
Compact sport utility vehicles
Crossover sport utility vehicles
2020s cars
Cars introduced in 2022
Front-wheel-drive vehicles
Cars of China